Kesab Debbarma is a politician from Tripura. Currently he is leader of Communist Party of India (Marxist). He was elected in 2008 and 2013 from Golaghati, becoming a Member of the Tripura Legislative Assembly.

References

Tripura MLAs 2008–2013
Year of birth missing (living people)
Living people
Tripura MLAs 2013–2018